Marius Simionescu (born 5 September 1997) is a Romanian rugby union football player. He plays as a  fullback for professional SuperLiga club, Timișoara Saracens. He also plays for Romania's national team, the Oaks, making his international debut at the 2017 mid-year rugby union internationals in a match against the Canadian Canucks.

Career
Before joining Timișoara Saracens' youth team, Simionescu played for CSS Unirea Iași.

Honours
Timișoara Saracens
 SuperLiga: 2016–17
 Romanian Cup: 2016

References

External links

 Marius Simionescu at Timișoara Saracens website

1997 births
Living people
People from Iași County
Romanian rugby union players
Romania international rugby union players
Rugby union fullbacks
SCM Rugby Timișoara players